The Women's alpine combined competition at the FIS Alpine World Ski Championships 2019 was held on 8 February 2019.

Results
The downhill competition was started at 11:30 and the slalom run at 16:15.

References

Women's alpine combined